Pontia beckerii, the Becker's white, Great Basin white, or sagebrush white, is a butterfly in the family Pieridae. It is found in western North America from Baja California, Mexico to southern British Columbia, Canada.

It is mostly white with small black markings; females have more dark markings. The species is similar to other checkered whites such as, Pontia sisymbrii, Pontia protodice, and Pontia occidentalis.

The wingspan is 33 to 48 millimeters.

The host plants are Isomeris arborea, Stanleya pinnata, Brassica nigra, Descurainia pinnata, Sisymbrium altissimum, Lepidium perfoliatum, Brassica nigra, Schoenocrambe linifolia, Thelypodium sagittatum, and Thelypodium laciniatum.

References

External links

 Butterflies and Moths of North-America: Pontia beckerii—Becker's White

beckerii
Butterflies of North America
Fauna of the Baja California Peninsula
Fauna of California
Fauna of the California chaparral and woodlands
Fauna of the Western United States
Butterflies described in 1871